The 2020 New Zealand Women's Sevens was a tournament at the Waikato Stadium in Hamilton, New Zealand from 25-26 January 2020. It was the first edition of the New Zealand Women's Sevens for the World Rugby Women's Sevens Series and the fourth tournament of the 2019–20 World Rugby Women's Sevens Series.

Format
The teams were drawn into three pools of four teams each. Each team played every other team in their pool once. The top team from each pool and the best second-placed team advanced to the semifinals to playoff for berths in the cup final and third place match. The other teams from each group were paired off for the lower classification matches.

Teams
Twelve teams competed in the tournament with eleven being the core teams that compete throughout the entire season.

Pool stage

Pool A

Pool B

Pool C

Placement matches

Eleventh place

Ninth place

Seventh place

Fifth place

Knockout stage

Cup

See also
 World Rugby Women's Sevens Series
 2019–20 World Rugby Women's Sevens Series
 2020 New Zealand Sevens

References

External links 
 World Rugby info

2020
2019–20 World Rugby Women's Sevens Series
2020 in women's rugby union
2020 in New Zealand sport
2020 in New Zealand rugby union
New Zealand Sevens